John Olav Krogh (12 September 1938 – 18 January 2019) was a Norwegian footballer who played as a forward.

Born in Trondheim, he played for SK Freidig (1957–60) and Rosenborg BK (1961–63).

He earned 11 caps for Norway, scoring four goals. He made his debut for them on 21 June 1962 in a 0–2 loss to neighbours Sweden at the Ullevaal Stadion in Oslo, in the first leg of the preliminary round of qualification for the 1964 European Nations' Cup. In his next game on 3 July, he scored his first international goal, the third of a 5–0 friendly win over Malta in his hometown. On 4 November, in the second leg at the Malmö Stadion, he opened a 1–1 draw that sent the Swedes through 3–1 on aggregate.

References

1938 births
2019 deaths
Footballers from Trondheim
Norwegian footballers
Association football forwards
Rosenborg BK players
Norway international footballers